The 2000 Kazakhstan Cup Final was the eighth final of the Kazakhstan Cup. The match was contested by Kairat and Access-Golden Grain at Kazhimukan Munaitpasov Stadium in Astana. The match was played on 6 July 2000 and was the final match of the competition.

Background
Kairat played the third Kazakhstan Cup Final. In both finals they beat rivals (Fosfor, 1992 final, 5–1; Vostok-Adil, 1997 final, 2–0)

Access-Golden Grain played the first Kazakhstan Cup Final.

Kairat and Access-Golden Grain played twice during the season of league. Access-Golden Grain have won both matches with the score 2–0 of Kairat.

Route to the Final

Kairat

Access-Golden Grain

Match

Details

References

2000 domestic association football cups
2000 in Kazakhstani football
1999 domestic association football cups
1999 in Kazakhstani football
Kazakhstan Cup Finals